Filkins is a surname. Notable people with the surname include:

Dexter Filkins (born 1961), American journalist
Grace Filkins (1865–1962), American stage actress
Les Filkins (born 1956), American baseball player
Perry Filkins (born 1998), American mixed martial artist
Peter Filkins, American poet and translator
Zach Filkins (born 1978), American musician and songwriter